Whispermoon is the debut studio album by Listener.  It was released on Mush Records on July 29, 2003. It peaked at number 163 on the CMJ Radio 200 chart and at number 4 on CMJ's Hip-Hop chart.

Critical reception
Jason MacNeil of AllMusic gave the album 3 stars out of 5, saying, "Not as polished or glossy as bigger rap stars, this record has a certain independent aura around it." Rollie Pemberton of Pitchfork gave the album a 6.6 out of 10 and said, "The saving grace of Whispermoon is its varied production."

Track listing

References

External links
 

2003 debut albums
Listener (band) albums
Mush Records albums